Herbert Ashton (23 May 1885 – 28 June 1927) was an English footballer who played for Accrington Stanley, Preston North End and West Ham United.

Career
Nicknamed 'Tiddler', Ashton started his footballing career with Padiham. He then played for Accrington Stanley, helping the club to win the Lancashire Combination league in 1905–06, and with Preston North End, where he made four appearances in the Football League.

Ashton signed for West Ham United in 1908, making his debut on 1 September 1908 against Queens Park Rangers; a 2–0 West Ham win. A firm fans' favourite and small in stature he was rarely without support from the fans when things got rough on the pitch, even to the extent of invading the pitch to protect Ashton in a match against New Brompton. Ashton holds the record for the most appearances in the Southern League for West Ham with 224 appearances. Ashton joined the Royal Flying Corps as a mechanic in World War I whilst still playing football for West Ham in the London Combination League.

References

1885 births
1927 deaths
Footballers from Blackburn
English footballers
Padiham F.C. players
Accrington Stanley F.C. players
Preston North End F.C. players
West Ham United F.C. players
English Football League players
Southern Football League players
Royal Flying Corps soldiers
Association football wingers
British Army personnel of World War I